Elections to Rossendale Borough Council were held on 3 May 2007.  One third of the council was up for election and the Conservative party stayed in overall control of the council.

After the election, the composition of the council was:
Conservative 22
Labour 12
Liberal Democrat 1
Independent 1

Election result

Ward results

References
 2007 Rossendale election result
 Ward results
 Election results 2007 
 Rossendale Borough Council Election Results 1973-2012

2007
2007 English local elections
2000s in Lancashire